Andrea Piechele (born 29 June 1987 in Cles) is an Italian former professional cyclist, who competed professionally between 2010 and 2015.

Major results

2008
 Giro del Friuli-Venezia Giulia
1st Points classification
1st Stage 2
 10th Trofeo Banca Popolare di Vicenza
2009
 2nd Giro del Medio Brenta
 3rd Trofeo Banca Popolare di Vicenza
2010
 2nd Circuito de Getxo
 6th Ronde van Drenthe
 9th Gran Premio della Costa Etruschi
 10th Cholet-Pays de Loire
2011
 8th Gran Premio Industria e Commercio Artigianato Carnaghese
2013
 3rd Memorial Marco Pantani
 3rd Tour du Jura
 4th Coppa Bernocchi
2014
 6th Coppa Ugo Agostoni
 7th Tour of Almaty
 9th Châteauroux Classic

References

External links

1987 births
Living people
Italian male cyclists
People from Cles
Sportspeople from Trentino
Cyclists from Trentino-Alto Adige/Südtirol